"Día Especial" is a Latin pop ballad performed by Colombian singer Shakira from her album Fijación Oral Vol. 1. The song is about how a day is made special with forgiveness. "Día Especial" is not an official single from Fijación Oral Vol. 1, but was popular around the time of the album's release, peaking at number 26 on the Billboard Latin Pop Airplay chart. Gustavo Cerati was the lyricist for the track with Shakira and Luis Fernando Ochoa as co-writers for the music. Shakira performed the song with Gustavo Cerati at the Live Earth concert in Germany on 7 July 2007. The English version of the song is titled "The Day and the Time" and is featured on the album Oral Fixation Vol. 2.

Charts

References

Spanish-language songs
Shakira songs
2005 singles
Pop ballads
Songs written by Shakira
Songs written by Luis Fernando Ochoa
Songs written by Gustavo Cerati
2000s ballads